30XX is a platform game from independent developer Batterystaple Games and the sequel to 20XX. It released in Steam early access on February 17, 2021, and is also planned to be released on consoles in the future. Like its predecessor, 30XX was inspired by the Mega Man series, but uses procedurally generated levels. However, unlike 20XX, the game possesses both a permadeath roguelike mode and a "Mega Mode" where the levels of the entire game are generated in advance and do not change upon death, giving players an experience more similar to the Mega Man games. The game follows the android main characters of 20XX, Nina and Ace, who awaken after a millennium to discover the world has changed irreversibly after the advent of the Synthetic Mind. The early access release of the game was positively received by critics, who called it an improvement over its predecessor.

Development 
Following complaints about the art style of 20XX, the art style was revamped for the sequel to be more similar to games such as Mega Man ZX. The sprites were created by the artist of Rogue Legacy, Glauber Kotaki.

Reception 
TJ Denzer of Shacknews called the game "sure to please any platforming fan whether you dig roguelikes or not". Mike Minotti of VentureBeat said that the game had a "nice visual boost" from its predecessor.

References 

Early access video games
Upcoming video games
Windows games
Windows-only games
Platform games
Science fiction video games
Multiplayer and single-player video games
Video games about robots
Video game sequels
Video games set in the 31st century
Video games about artificial intelligence
Video games developed in the United States
Video games featuring female protagonists
Video games using procedural generation
Indie video games